Ab Nik (also Romanized as Āb Nīk, Abnak, and Ābnīk ) is a village in Rudbar-e Qasran Rural District, Rudbar-e Qasran District, Shemiranat County, Tehran Province, Iran. At the 2006 census, its population was 274, in 78 families.

References 

Populated places in Shemiranat County